Nationality words link to articles with information on the nation's poetry or literature (for instance, Irish or France).

Events
 First publication of the 16th century Scottish Bannatyne Manuscript begins in Edinburgh by the Bannatyne Club.

Works published in English

United Kingdom
 Bernard Barton, A Widow's Tale, and Other Poems
 Robert Bloomfield, The Poems of Robert Bloomfield
 Edward Lytton Bulwer (later Bulwer-Lytton), published anonymously, O'Neill, or, The Rebel
 John Clare, The Shepherd's Calendar; with Village Stories and Other Poems
 George Darley, Sylvia; or, The May Queen
 Reginald Heber, Hymns
 Thomas Hood:
 The Plea of the Midsummer Fairies; Hero and Leander; Lycus the Centaur; and Other Poems
 Whims and Oddities in Prose and Verse, second series, poetry and prose (see also Whims and Oddities 1826)
 May Howitt, and William Howitt, The Desolation of Eyam; The Emigrant; A Tale of the American Woods, and Other Poems
 John Keble, published anonymously, The Christian Year, 100 editions were published by 1866
 Letitia Elizabeth Landon, writing under the pen name "L.E.L.", The Golden Violet, and Other Poems
 Robert Millhouse, Sherwood Forest: and other poems.
 Mary Russell Mitford, Dramatic Scenes, Sonnets, and Other Poems
 James Montgomery, The Pelican Island, and Other Poems
 Robert Pollok, The Course of Time, Scottish
 Agnes Strickland, The Seven Ages of Woman, and Other Poems
 Alfred Lord Tennyson, Charles Tennyson, and Frederick Tennyson, published anonymously, Poems, by Two Brothers, despite the title, there were three authors
 William Wordsworth, The Poetical Works of William Wordsworth, text very much revised from Miscellaneous Poems 1820; see also Poetical Works 1836, Poetical Works 1840, and Poetical Works (Centenary Edition) 1870

United States
 Sumner Lincoln Fairfield, "The Cities of the Plain", a narrative poem about the destruction of Sodom and Gomorrah
 Fitz-Greene Halleck, Alnwick Castle, with Other Poems, the author's first book of poetry sold well and was praised by critics
 Edgar Allan Poe, Tamerlane and Other Poems, initially published anonymously; the author's first poetry book; including "Visit of the Dead", "The Lake", "Evening Star", and "Imitation"
 Lydia Sigourney, Poems
 William Gilmore Simms:
Lyrical and Other Poems
 Early Lays
 Nathaniel Parker Willis, Sketches, the author's first poetry book; mostly Biblical paraphrases

Other in English
 Henry Louis Vivian Derozio, Poems, Calcutta: Baptist Mission Press; India, Indian poetry in English

Works published in other languages
 Heinrich Heine, Buch der Lieder ("Book of Songs"), the author's first major poetry collection, German author and poet living in France
Giacomo Leopardi, Operette Morali

Births
Death years link to the corresponding "[year] in poetry" article:
 February 17 – Rose Terry Cooke (died 1892), American
 April 16 – Octave Crémazie (died 1879), Canadian, "the father of French Canadian poetry"
 June 9 – Francis Miles Finch (died 1907), American
 June 18 – Helen Hinsdale Rich (died 1915), American poet
 September 18 – John Townsend Trowbridge (died 1916), American
 November 8 – José Bonifácio the Younger (died 1886), French-born Brazilian politician and poet
 November 26 – Emily Jane Pfeiffer (died 1890), Welsh poet and philanthropist
 Henry Alfred Krishnapillai (died 1900), Indian Tamil language poet
 John Hollin Ridge (died 1867), American
 Fazal Shah Sayyad (died 1890), Indian Punjabi language poet

Deaths

Birth years link to the corresponding "[year] in poetry" article:
 January 6 – Charlotte von Stein (born 1742), German member of the court at Weimar, poet and close friend of Johann Wolfgang von Goethe (on whom she was a strong influence) and of Friedrich Schiller
 May 12 – David Richards (Dafydd Ionawr) (born 1751), Welsh
 May 29 – Carlos Wilcox (born 1794), American
 July 3 – David Davis (Castellhywel) (born 1745), Welsh minister and poet
 August 8 – George Canning (born 1770), English statesman and occasional poet
 August 12 – William Blake (born 1757), English poet, artist and visionary
 September 10 – Ugo Foscolo (born 1778), Italian writer, revolutionary and poet
 September 15 – Robert Pollok (born c. 1798), Scottish
 November 10 – St. George Tucker (born 1752), American poet, lawyer and professor of law at the College of William and Mary
 November 18 – Wilhelm Hauff (born 1802, German poet and novelist

See also
 Poetry
 List of years in poetry
 List of years in literature
 19th century in literature
 19th century in poetry
 Romantic poetry
 Golden Age of Russian Poetry (1800–1850)

 Weimar Classicism period in Germany, commonly considered to have begun in 1788  and to have ended either in 1805, with the death of Friedrich Schiller, or 1832, with the death of Goethe
 List of poets

Notes

19th-century poetry
Poetry